Miracle is the ninth English-language and twenty-first studio album by Canadian singer Celine Dion, released by Columbia on 11 October 2004. It is a concept album credited to Dion and Australian photographer Anne Geddes. The songs were produced by David Foster. Miracle topped the chart in Canada and Belgium Wallonia, and reached top five in the United States, United Kingdom, France and the Netherlands. It was certified Platinum in the US, and Gold in various countries.

Content and release
Miracle is a part of a CD-and-book multimedia collection, with Dion's music providing the soundtrack to Geddes's pictorial book celebrating the joy of babies. The songs were produced by David Foster, who had not worked with Dion since 1999.

Among tracks on the album are cover versions of John Lennon's "Beautiful Boy", Louis Armstrong's "What a Wonderful World", Roberta Flack's "The First Time Ever I Saw Your Face", Johannes Brahms's "Brahms' Lullaby", Nancy Wilson's "If I Could", Henri Salvador's "Le loup, la biche et le chevalier (une chanson douce)", and Carol Welsman's "Baby Close Your Eyes".

All other tracks are original songs such as the title track, which was written in 2001 for A New Day Has Come to celebrate the birth of Dion's son René-Charles, but the song was never published on that album.

Some tracks were previously released on Dion's albums, including "Brahms's Lullaby" on These Are Special Times and "The First Time Ever I Saw Your Face" on All the Way... A Decade of Song. Live performances of "If I Could" and "What a Wonderful World" were available on A New Day... Live in Las Vegas. "A Mother's Prayer" is a solo version of "The Prayer", a duet with Andrea Bocelli from These Are Special Times. "Le loup, la biche et le chevalier (une chanson douce)" was performed live by Dion and Henri Salvador in October 2003, during the taping of 1 fille & 4 types TV special. However, this duet version was not included on any album.

Miracle was released in three different formats: CD; CD/DVD plus 60-page booklet; and 180-page hardcover book plus CD/DVD. "Je lui dirai", available previously on 1 fille & 4 types, was included as a bonus track in Francophone countries.

Singles
"Beautiful Boy" was released as the first single in North America and some parts of Europe. It was followed by "In Some Small Way" in the United States and Canada. "Je lui dirai" was released as a single in Francophone countries, while the title track was issued as a single in the United Kingdom and parts of Asia. All these songs were released as radio singles without accompanying music videos.

Critical reception

Miracle was met with mixed reviews. AllMusic said that "it's the quietest record Dion has recorded in a while, an unabashed adult contemporary album that keeps its gentle mood from start to finish, as if it were a prolonged lullaby. Dion tempers her vocal histrionics considerably — she still soars to the high notes, but there are no pyrotechnics, no showboating here — which serves this collection of standards and new songs quite well".

Commercial performance
Miracle debuted inside top 10 in many countries, reaching number one in Canada, Belgium Wallonia. It debuted at number four in the United States with 107,000 copies sold. It also debuted in the fourth position in France and the Netherlands, number five in the United Kingdom, number six in Switzerland and number 9 in Greece. Miracle set a record in the United States, spending 18 consecutive weeks at the top position on the Billboard Top Kid Audio chart.

It was certified Platinum in the United States and Gold in the United Kingdom, France, Switzerland, Italy, and Belgium. Three months after its release, the Miracle CD has sold more than two million copies worldwide. The book/CD/DVD package has also been successful, reaching 500,000 copies sold.

Accolades

At the Juno Awards of 2005, Miracle was nominated in two categories, including Album of the Year and Pop Album of the Year. Dion was also nominated for the Juno Award for Artist of the Year. Miracle was also nominated for the Félix Award in category Anglophone Album of the Year.

Track listing
All tracks produced by David Foster, except "Je lui dirai" by Erick Benzi.

Charts

Weekly charts

Year-end charts

Decade-end charts

Certifications and sales

Release history

See also
List of number-one albums of 2004 (Canada)

References

External links
 

2004 albums
Albums produced by David Foster
Celine Dion albums
Concept albums